The All-Ireland Senior Hurling Championship 1909 was the 23rd series of the All-Ireland Senior Hurling Championship, Ireland's premier hurling knock-out competition.  Kilkenny won the championship, beating Tipperary 4-6 to 0-12 in the final.

Format

All-Ireland Championship

Semi-finals: (2 matches) The four provincial representatives made up the semi-final pairings.  Two teams are eliminated at this stage while the two winning teams advance to the All-Ireland final.

Final: (1 match) The winners of the two semi-finals contest this game with the winners being declared All-Ireland champions.

Results

Leinster Senior Hurling Championship

Munster Senior Hurling Championship

All-Ireland Senior Hurling Championship

References

Sources
 Corry, Eoghan, The GAA Book of Lists (Hodder Headline Ireland, 2005).
 Donegan, Des, The Complete Handbook of Gaelic Games (DBA Publications Limited, 2005).

1909